Wooden Overcoats is a British sitcom podcast created and written by David K. Barnes, and directed and produced by Andy Goddard and John Wakefield. It premiered on September 24, 2015, and completed its run on March 31, 2022 with the conclusion of its fourth season.

The series is set in the fictional English village of Piffling Vale and follows the rivalry between two funeral directors, after the members of the family-run funeral home who had been in charge of all of the village's funerals find their lives turned upside down by another undertaker who moves in right across the street to open a competing business.

Plot

Stubborn undertaker Rudyard Funn runs Funn Funerals with the help of his asocial sister Antigone and their assistant Georgie Crusoe. Funn Funerals, which was previously owned by Rudyard and Antigone's parents, is the only funeral parlour in the village of Piffling Vale, which is located on a small, isolated English island; as such, despite Rudyard's unpopularity within the community, his business has remained successful due to the absence of available competition.

This all changes with the arrival of dashing new undertaker Eric Chapman, who sets up his business across the square. Chapman immediately becomes popular with the citizens of Piffling Vale, and with his modern, joyful company instantly becoming more popular than the sober, traditional style of Funn Funerals, the work-obsessed siblings find their business threatened, setting off a bitter rivalry with Chapman in which Funn Funerals will do anything they must to ensure the business survives.

Tensions progressively heighten as the feud spirals out of control, with Funn Funeral's increasingly over-the-top attempts to sabotage Chapman soon affecting the entire village. These unfolding events are narrated by Madeleine, a mouse that resides in Funn Funerals and is Rudyard's best friend.

Cast and characters

Main 
 Belinda Lang as Madeleine, a mouse who lives at Funn Funerals and Rudyard's best friend. She acts as the narrator of the story, which she dutifully records in the hopes of releasing them as a biographical book, "Memoirs of a Funeral House Mouse". She only makes mouse squeak noises (performed by Holly Campbell) when not acting as a narrator to the audience, although several of the show's characters understand her when she squeaks.
 Felix Trench as Rudyard Funn, the owner and funeral director of Funn Funerals, in charge of interacting with clients and organizing the ceremonies. Stubborn, caring only about his work, and lacking empathy for his grieving clients, he devellops an immediate hatred of Chapman, both out of jealousy for his success and out of contempt for his unusual methods. Unpopular among the citizens of Piffling Vale and caring little for them, he sets out to outdo Chapman in any possible way.
 Beth Eyre as Antigone Funn, Rudyard's twin sister and the mortician of Funn Funerals, in charge of preparing the corpses for the funerals. A shut-in who suffers from severe lifelong depression and went through many years of near-total social isolation in the funeral house, to the point where most villagers believe she has passed away, she differs from her brother in that her reluctance to engage in social interaction stems from fear rather than disinterest. Spending most of her time in the funeral house's mortuary, which she considered her sacred haven, she is gloomy and even more socially inept than her brother, but is passionate about her work, and becomes more confident and assertive over the course of the series, notably becoming Funn Funerals' co-owner alongside Rudyard at the end of season 1. Although she despises Chapman as a competitor, she is also irresistibly attracted to him.
 Ciara Baxendale as Georgie Crusoe, the Funns' assistant, notably in charge of building and carrying the coffins. Confident, resourceful and more socially skilled than the siblings, she is a considerable asset to them, although she is often reluctant or too lazy to provide more effort than the minimum. Having started to work with the Funns after arriving to Piffling Vale with her grandmother prior to the beginning of the series, she is originally uncaring and emotionally detached from them, but grows closer to them over the course of the series. She later takes on a second job as Mayor Desmond's secretary.
 Tom Crowley as Eric Chapman, a new arrival in Piffling Vale who opens a funeral home of his own. His positive, wholesome behavior is completely at odd with Rudyard's, as is his vision of funerals, which he makes party-like and cheerful instead of sober. He is very popular with the villagers, and is very competitive in his feud with Funn Funerals, although he remains cordial towards them. Little is known about his life prior to his arrival, although he occasionally hints at having led a dark and mysterious past.
 Andy Secombe as Reverend Nigel Wavering, who is tasked with delivering eulogies at funerals, and therefore often works with funeral houses. Despite being a Reverend, he is actually an agnostic, and as such his eulogies are filled with lengthy statements conveying religious ideas while questioning them.
 Steve Hodson (season 1) and Sean Baker (season 2-4) as Mayor Desmond Desmond, the longstanding mayor of Piffling Vale and Nigel's boyfriend. Good-hearted but clueless, forgetful and fairly incompetent, he usually lets his assistant do most of the work, although he does not realize it himself. Hodson portrays the character in the first season, but was unavailable for season 2 and replaced by Baker; in reference to Hodson previously voicing the character, he makes a cameo in the series finale as Desmond's twin brother, also named Desmond.
 Alison Skilbeck as Agatha Doyle, the owner of the village's candy shop who is also an on-and-off detective.
 Paul Putner as Sid Marlowe, a journalist and writer for Piffling Vale's sole newspaper, Piffling Matters.
 Elle McAlpine as Marjorie Smith (regular season 1; guest season 2; recurring season 4), Mayor Desmond's secretary. Due to his forgetfulness and incompetence, she ends up doing almost all of his work for him.
 Alana Ross as Jennifer Delacroix (season 2-4), an amateur journalist who broadcasts her radio news show from her mother's house. She later becomes Georgie's girlfriend.

Recurring 
 Caroline Quentin as Madame Lansbury Manning
 Hugh Fraser as Roger Noggins
 Andy Hamilton as Herbert Cough
 Kieran Hodgson as Serge
 Max Olesker as Seymour Profitte
 Julia Deakin as Nana Crusoe
 Thom Tuck as Captain Scott Sodbury
 Jason Forbes as Baz
 Phil Wang as Wez
 Ben Norris as Miles Fahrenheit
 Katy Manning as Bijou
 Sarah Thom as Petunia Bloom

Production

The idea of a story involving two competing undertakers arose from discussions between eventual cast members Felix Trench and Tom Crowley. Trench shared a lodging in London with writer David K. Barnes, who was looking for a new project. The initial idea was to create a short film out of the idea, but the large budget required to do that, and also the increasing popularity of podcasts, meant Wooden Overcoats became an audio project.

Much of the series was recorded in a repurposed music studio. Narration was recorded in an audiobook studio and there were also scenes recorded on-location.

Wooden Overcoats concluded after four seasons, released between 2015 and 2022. A number of live shows were also done at Kings Place in Kings Cross, London, as episodes from the fourth season were released in early 2022. The final episode, A Funn Farewell, was released on the 31st March 2022.

Reception

Critical reception
Wooden Overcoats received an extremely positive critical reception, with the New Statesman describing the series as "funnier than anything broadcast on the BBC". In another favourable comparison to the BBC, the Daily Telegraph stated in 2018 that the "release of this funny, clever, independently produced sitcom marks a quietly significant moment in British radio comedy, when the BBC networks stopped being the only conduit by which top-rank young writers and actors got their wares to market."

Writing for the New York Times, Phoebe Letts wrote, "over the four available seasons of “Wooden Overcoats,” it becomes impossible not to adore everyone in the village.” And in the Reader's Digest, Chloë Nannestad stated that, “this podcast is hilarious, charming, there’s three seasons of it to fill your longest driving day and there’s also a mouse called Madeleine. Download immediately".

Wooden Overcoats has been described as a "shining example of the power of the form (of audio drama)” by Forbes, a "very funny, very British radio drama" by Wired and a "hit podcast" by The Independent.

Awards and nominations
Wooden Overcoats won two awards in the Audioverse Awards 2016 for 'Best Original Long Form Cast' in a comedic production and also 'Best Actor in a Leading Role' for Felix Trench. The series also won a silver award in the British Podcast Awards 2017 for Best Fiction Podcast. In 2018, Wooden Overcoats had further success at the Audioverse Awards, winning 5 in total. These were for Best Audio Engineering, Best Original Composition, Best Production, Best Writing and Best Ensemble Performance.

References

External links

Audio podcasts
British podcasts
Comedy and humor podcasts
Scripted podcasts